The 2012 Stanley Cup Finals was the championship series of the National Hockey League's (NHL)  season, and the culmination of the 2012 Stanley Cup playoffs. The Western Conference playoff champion Los Angeles Kings defeated the Eastern Conference playoff champion New Jersey Devils four games to two, capturing the first Stanley Cup title in the team's 45-year history, dealing the Devils just their second Stanley Cup Finals defeat in five tries and first since . Kings goaltender Jonathan Quick was awarded the Conn Smythe Trophy as the Most Valuable Player of the playoffs.

It was the first championship series since 2007 whose Stanley Cup-clinching game was played on the winning team's home ice.

The Eastern Conference winner had home ice advantage for the first time since , since the Devils had a better regular season record than the Kings. With the Devils entering the playoffs as the ninth seed of the 16 playoff teams by regular season record (no division titles) and the Kings as the 13th, their combined seed of 22 was the second highest of any playoff matchup (only trailing the 1991 Cup Finals with 23), and it was the first playoff matchup with no team seeded better than 9th. The Kings became the first, as well as the last eighth-seeded team to win the Stanley Cup since the conference-based seedings were introduced in 1994.

Paths to the Finals

Los Angeles Kings

The Los Angeles Kings historically have not fared well in the postseason, having only progressed beyond second round of the playoffs once in franchise history. There were some highlights in franchise history, such as a dramatic seven-game series loss to the heavily favored Boston Bruins in 1976, the upset of the top seeded Edmonton Oilers (including the game three Miracle on Manchester) in 1982, and a comeback from a 3–1 series deficit to beat the defending Stanley Cup champion Oilers in 1989. From 1994 to 2011 the Kings won just one playoff series, during the 2001 postseason when they upset the Detroit Red Wings in six games (featuring the game four "Stunner at Staples") and coming back from a 3–1 deficit to push the eventual Cup champions Colorado Avalanche to seven games.

The Kings started the regular season at 13–12–4 before firing head coach Terry Murray on December 12, 2011. John Stevens served as interim coach before the team hired Darryl Sutter on December 20. Under Sutter, the Kings finished the season at 95 points. The Kings lost their final two regular season games to fall from first place in the Pacific Division (and the #3 seed in the West) to third place in the division and eighth in the conference. The Kings won only 40 out 82 games, and with 95 points became first losing record team to finish the season with more than 90 points.

The Kings then went on to become the second team to eliminate the first, second and thirds seeds from the playoffs in the same postseason (and the first team to do so in that order), after the 2003–04 Calgary Flames, also coached by Darryl Sutter, eliminating the Vancouver Canucks in five games, the St. Louis Blues in four games, and the Phoenix Coyotes in five games. In addition, the Kings went a perfect 8–0 on the road in these playoff games and the first team to go undefeated while en route to the Final.

Kings players Jarret Stoll and Matt Greene were part of that Oilers team in 2006, while teammate Justin Williams played for the Cup-winning Hurricanes.

New Jersey Devils

The Devils started the season having missed the playoffs in the 2010–11 season for the first time since 1995–96 season, breaking a 13 consecutive post-season appearance streak. This was the Devils' first season under head coach Peter DeBoer, who replaced the retiring Jacques Lemaire during the offseason. Under DeBoer, New Jersey finished the regular season with 102 points, but ended up with the sixth seed in the Eastern Conference playoffs.

The Devils eliminated DeBoer's former team, the Southeast division-winning Florida Panthers, in seven games, and two of their division rivals, first the fifth-seeded Philadelphia Flyers in five games, and the first-seeded New York Rangers in six games.

Game summaries
 Number in parenthesis represents the player's total in goals or assists to that point of the entire four rounds of the playoffs

Game one

Los Angeles scored first on Colin Fraser's goal at 09:56 of the first period. The Kings then held the Devils without a shot on goal for the first 14 minutes of the second period, but could not increase their lead. The Devils tied the game at 18:48 of the second period when Anton Volchenkov's shot bounced off of Kings defenceman Slava Voynov and into the Los Angeles net. At 3:58 of the third period, a Devils goal was waved off when Zach Parise illegally pushed the puck with his hand over the Kings goal line. Anze Kopitar beat Martin Brodeur on a breakaway goal 8:13 into overtime to give the Kings a 2–1 win in game one. The Kings' Jonathan Quick made 17 out of 18 saves, while Brodeur made 23 out of 25.

With the win, the Kings became the first team to win their first nine road games in a single postseason.

Game two

The Kings extended their 2012 playoff road winning streak to ten with another 2–1 overtime victory. This time, it was Jeff Carter who scored at 13:42 of the extra period. After Carter's initial shot from the right side was stopped, he then went around the net to grab the puck on the other side and then made a shot through traffic that beat Martin Brodeur. Los Angeles scored first on Drew Doughty's unassisted goal at 7:49 of the first period. The Devils tied the game at 2:59 of the third period when Ryan Carter deflected Marek Zidlicky's shot into the Kings' net. Neither team could take advantage of their power plays, nor on a 4-on-4 late in the third period. Both teams had more shots than game one; Jonathan Quick made 32 out of 33 saves, while Brodeur made 30 out of 32.

Game three

Los Angeles scored four goals, and Jonathan Quick stopped all 22 New Jersey shots, as the Kings defeated the Devils 4–0. The Kings' first goal at 5:58 of the second period was controversial. Dwight King's original shot against Martin Brodeur was stopped, but King kept on swiping the puck until Alec Martinez finally pushed it across the goal line. Brodeur argued that he had the puck covered up just before Martinez's shot, but the officials did not blow the play dead and the goal stood. The Kings' scored their second goal at 15:07 of the third period when Justin Williams sent a pass near the boards to Dustin Brown, who then passed to Anze Kopitar on the other side, who then lifted the puck over Brodeur. In the third period, two New Jersey penalties led to two Los Angeles power play goals. Meanwhile, New Jersey could not score off of Los Angeles' five penalties during the game, including Jeff Carter's high-sticking double-minor in the first period that led to a Devils 5 on 3 for about a minute.

This contest also saw the return of Kings' left winger Simon Gagne, who had been out of the Los Angeles lineup since December 26, 2011, due to a head injury. Gagne, who played in the Stanley Cup Finals for the second time in three years, took Brad Richardson's spot in the lineup. In 2010, Gagne, along with current Kings teammates Mike Richards and Jeff Carter, were members of the Philadelphia Flyers that lost to the Chicago Blackhawks in six games.

With the win, the Kings became the first team in NHL history to take a 3–0 series lead in all four rounds of the playoffs.

Game four

New Jersey avoided being swept for the first time in team history when Adam Henrique scored at 15:29 of the third period to break a 1–1 tie, and Ilya Kovalchuk added an empty-netter with 19.1 seconds left, defeating the Kings 3–1, and forcing a fifth game. This marked the third time in this playoffs that the Kings failed to close out a series in game four after winning the first three games. The game remained scoreless until 7:56 of the third period when Patrik Elias shot a rebound into the Los Angeles net, giving New Jersey their first lead of the series. This lead was cut short a minute later, as David Clarkson was called for boarding at 8:52, and four seconds later Drew Doughty tied the game with a power play goal for the Kings. With the loss, the Kings failed to match the record set by the Edmonton Oilers, who was the last team to lose only two games in their 1988 championship run with at least 16 required games played in a four-round format.

Game five

New Jersey scored first at 12:45 of the first period, their first power play goal of the series, after Jonathan Quick misplayed the puck and Zach Parise found an open net on the other side before the Los Angeles goalie could recover. The Kings tied the game at 3:26 of the second when Justin Williams took a pass from Matt Greene, skated into the New Jersey zone and beat Martin Brodeur. But the Devils took the lead for good at 9:05 of the second when Bryce Salvador's shot deflected off of Kings defenceman Slava Voynov into the Los Angeles net. Jarret Stoll's goal at 11:16 of the second period, which would have tied the game, was waved off because he shot it with a high-stick. The Devils later held on for the final minute of the game on a 4-on-4 and the Kings pulling their goalie for the extra attacker on what became essentially a 5-on-4 advantage.

Game six

The Kings defeated the Devils 6–1 to capture the series and win their first Stanley Cup in team history. This was the most lopsided Cup-clinching game since , when the Pittsburgh Penguins won game six by beating the Minnesota North Stars 8–0. At 10:10 of the first period, New Jersey's Steve Bernier was assessed a major boarding penalty and a game misconduct on a hit to Los Angeles' Rob Scuderi. The Kings then put the game out of reach by scoring three goals on the ensuing five-minute power play (when a major penalty is assessed, the full five-minute penalty must be served)—the first by Dustin Brown, the second by Jeff Carter, and the third by Trevor Lewis.

Carter then beat Martin Brodeur to score his second goal of the game at 1:50 of the second period after Anton Volchenkov collided with a linesman while trying to defend Brown, who was carrying the puck into the New Jersey Zone. Unimpeded after Volchenkov was screened from the play, Brown easily got the pass off to Carter. Adam Henrique got the Devils' lone goal at 18:45 of the second period after getting the rebound off of a shot by Petr Sykora. Lewis added an empty net goal at 16:15 of the third period after Brodeur was pulled for an extra attacker. With Brodeur back in the net, Matt Greene scored the Kings' sixth goal of the game 15 seconds later.

Regarding Bernier's game-changing penalty, Rich Chere of The Star-Ledger wrote that it was "the most devastating call in the Stanley Cup finals since the illegal curve on Marty McSorley's stick in ". Several Devils fans and other observers believed that there was inconsistency with the officials' calls, and that they missed a couple of calls on the Kings at the time of that hit, such as one Jarret Stoll made on the Devils' Stephen Gionta. But James Mirtle of The Globe and Mail gave credit to the referees for making the hard call, stating that "Scuderi had his back to Bernier much of the play ... It's also the type of play the league showcased at the GM meetings as one where more and more players had been 'letting up' rather than plowing a vulnerable opponent from behind. The NHL, in other words, wants these hits out of the game."

Notes
The 2012 Stanley Cup Finals marked the first time two American-born captains faced off in the championship series of the NHL as Dustin Brown of Los Angeles battled against Zach Parise of New Jersey. This scenario ensured a second time in league history of an American-born captain leading his team to the Stanley Cup championship.

These finals guaranteed the lowest-seeded Stanley Cup champion in history. With the Kings' victory, they became the first team ever to win the Stanley Cup as the eighth seed. They are also the second team to win the Stanley Cup without having home ice advantage in any of the four rounds of the playoffs, also after the Devils in 1995.

For the second consecutive Finals, both participating teams' arenas (New Jersey's Prudential Center and Los Angeles' Staples Center) served as host to their first Stanley Cup Finals. The Prudential Center opened prior to the  season, while the Staples Center opened in time for the  season (in 2011, the Boston Bruins' TD Garden and Vancouver Canucks' Rogers Arena, which both opened within days of one another in September 1995, were the two venues that had the honors).

The Kings are the fourth consecutive team to win the Stanley Cup after opening the season in Europe as part of the NHL Premiere Series. Previous NHL Premiere participants (Pittsburgh—, Chicago—, Boston—) went on to win the Cup.

Jonathan Quick became the third American Conn Smythe Trophy winner, following previous winners Brian Leetch and Tim Thomas (2011).

Team rosters
Years indicated in boldface under the "Finals appearance" column signify that the player won the Stanley Cup in the given year.

Los Angeles Kings

New Jersey Devils

Stanley Cup engraving
The 2012 Stanley Cup was presented to Los Angeles Kings captain Dustin Brown by NHL Commissioner Gary Bettman, following the Kings 6–1 win over the New Jersey Devils in the sixth game of the finals.

The following Kings players and staff had their names engraved on the Stanley Cup

2011–12 Los Angeles Kings

Officials
The following officials were chosen for the Stanley Cup Finals:
Referees: Dan O'Halloran, Dan O'Rourke, Chris Rooney, Brad Watson
Linesmen: Derek Amell, Jean Morin, Pierre Racicot, Jonny Murray

Television
In Canada, the series was televised in English on CBC and in French on the cable network RDS. In the United States, NBC broadcast the first two and the final two games, while the NBC Sports Network televised games three and four.

The 2012 Final rated poorly in comparison to the four most recent Stanley Cup Finals on United States television. The first four games were marred by low ratings; had the series ended in four games, this series would have produced the lowest television ratings ever for a championship series of any major league sport. However, game five and game six produced somewhat higher ratings than the first four games, which gave the 2012 Final a slightly higher rating than the  Final (which was on par with the  Final); the 2007 Final therefore remains the lowest-rated championship series in American television history.

References
Inline citations

Bibliography

External links

 2012 Stanley Cup Final Official Site
 2012 Stanley Cup Final at ESPN

2011–12 NHL season
 
Los Angeles Kings games
New Jersey Devils games
Stanley Cup Finals
Ice hockey competitions in Los Angeles
Sports competitions in Newark, New Jersey
21st century in Newark, New Jersey
Stanley Cup Finals
Stanley Cup Finals
Stanley Cup Finals
Stanley Cup Finals
Stanley Cup Finals
Ice hockey competitions in New Jersey